French writer Jacques Natanson (15 May 1901 – 19 May 1975) first became involved in the movies in 1929 when one of his plays was adapted for the screen. He enjoyed a fruitful collaboration with Max Ophüls, on such films as "La Ronde" (1951, earning an Academy Award nomination), "Le Plaisir" (1952) and "Lola Montès" (1955).

Selected filmography
 To Be Loved (1933)
 Moscow Nights (1934)
 Song of Farewell (1934)
 Volga in Flames (1934)
 Les yeux noirs (1935)
 Michel Strogoff (1936)
 The Cheat (1937)
 The Silent Battle (1937)
 Storm Over Asia (1938)
 Sarajevo (1940)
 Song of the Clouds (1946)
 After Love (1948)
 The White Night (1948)
 The Lady of the Camellias (1953)

External links
 

1901 births
1975 deaths
French male screenwriters
20th-century French screenwriters
French male dramatists and playwrights
20th-century French male writers